The Men's slalom competition of the Lake Placid 1980 Olympics was held at Whiteface Mountain.

The defending world champion was Ingemar Stenmark of Sweden, who was also the defending World Cup slalom champion and the leader of the 1980 World Cup.

Results

References 

Men's slalom
Winter Olympics